Calotomus is a parrotfish genus from the Indo-Pacific, with a single species ranging into the warmer parts of the east Pacific. Compared to most of their relatives, their colours are relatively dull. Several species in this genus are associated with sea grass beds, but most can also be seen at reefs.

Species
The genus includes these extant species:

 Calotomus carolinus (Valenciennes, 1840) (Carolines parrotfish)
 
 
 Calotomus japonicus (Valenciennes, 1840) (Japanese parrotfish)
 Calotomus spinidens (Quoy & Gaimard, 1824) (Spinytooth parrotfish)
 Calotomus viridescens (Rüppell, 1835) (Viridescent parrotfish)
 Calotomus zonarchus (Jenkins, 1903) (Yellowbar parrotfish) 

The fossil species, Calotomus preisli has been recovered from middle Miocene beds from Austria, suggesting the Paratethys Sea might have been tropical.

References

 
 Bony fish in the online Sepkoski Database

 
Scaridae
Taxa named by Charles Henry Gilbert
Marine fish genera